NASA's Exploration Ground Systems (EGS) Program is one of three programs based at NASA's Kennedy Space Center in Florida. EGS was established to develop and operate the systems and facilities necessary to process and launch rockets and spacecraft during assembly, transport and launch. EGS is preparing the infrastructure to support NASA's Space Launch System (SLS) rocket and its payloads, such as the Orion spacecraft for Artemis I. Artemis I is the first to launch in a series of increasingly complex missions that will enable human exploration to the Moon and Mars.

EGS assets 
EGS holds and operates the following assets:
 Vehicle Assembly Building
 Launch Control Center, Firing Rooms 1, 2, & 3
 Crawler-transporter
 ML-1 and ML-2
 Launch Pad 39B

History 
EGS was originally entitled the Ground Systems Development and Operations (GSDO) Program. It has its roots in the Constellation program (2005-2010), but only took control of assets and commenced operations under SLS (from 2010). For example, after the final launch of the Space Shuttle, GSDO took responsibility for LC-39A. However, there were no plans to use this pad, and basic maintenance was costing millions per year. In 2013, NASA signed a long-term lease of LC-39A to SpaceX. Blue Origin filed a protest to the Government Accountability Office that the pad should not be made exclusive, and should be operated by a tenant that would sublease to multiple different users and rockets to take advantage of. However, the GAO rejected this petition and allowed the lease to SpaceX, as there was no stated preference by NASA for or against a multiuser approach.

EGS was intended in general to "support several different kinds of spacecraft and rockets that are in development ... unlike previous work focusing on a single kind of launch vehicle, such as the Saturn V or Space Shuttle ... EGS's mission is to transform the center from a historically government-only launch complex to a spaceport that can handle several different kinds of spacecraft and rockets—both government and commercial.". The other LC-39 pad, LC-39B, specifically was intended to support multiple users. However, as time went on, the alternate launch vehicles that were to use LC-39B were all eventually removed from the plan or canceled entirely, such as Liberty and OmegA. OmegA was the final removal, with its cancellation and planned demolition of its launch tower in September 2020. This leaves EGS solely focused on supporting the Space Launch System and Orion spacecraft, meaning LC-39B will enjoy at most one launch per year under current launch manifests. In the end, LC-39A is leased exclusively to SpaceX, and LC-39B will be used exclusively by SLS for the foreseeable future.

Charlie Blackwell-Thompson serves as launch director for NASA's Exploration Ground Systems Program. She will oversee the countdown and liftoff of NASA's Space Launch System rocket and Orion spacecraft. Named to the position in January 2016, Blackwell-Thompson is NASA's first female launch director.

Launch platforms 

One of the primary activities of EGS has been to prepare all infrastructure needed to launch SLS. SLS will use a mobile launcher platform, which is a launch structure that moves out with the rocket to the launch pad (LC-39B), carried atop a Crawler Transporter.

ML-1 for SLS block 1
Under the Constellation program, a new platform was constructed, called Mobile Launcher-1 (ML-1), for the Ares I. This initial construction was completed in August 2010, at a cost of $234 million. After the cancellation of Constellation and the beginning of SLS, NASA decided to modify ML-1 for SLS. In August 2011, it was estimated that modifying ML-1 would cost $54M, modifying the old Space Shuttle launch platform would cost $93M, and building a brand new platform would cost $122M. However, in March 2020, a report from the NASA Inspector General came out, stating that ML-1 is running 3 years behind schedule and had cost $927M in total ($234M for the initial construction for Ares, and $693M for adapting it for SLS). The program manager of EGS stated in January 2020 that: "The EGS team has finished mobile launcher testing at the launch pad and will finish testing at the VAB in January. At that point, all of the launch infrastructure will be tested and ready for operations." ML-1 is only tall enough to be used for Block 1 of the SLS, so the current manifest calls for it to be used for three missions: Artemis 1 through 3, with the first to be launched in November 2022. Following the launch of Artemis 1 on 16th of November 2022, ML-1 sustained minor damaged to some compoments with 2 elevator doors having been blown out.

ML-2 for SLS block 1B
In October 2017, it was decided that modifying ML-1 again for the even larger SLS Block 1B was undesirable, as it would induce a 33-month delay between SLS launches to undertake the needed modifications. Congress funded $350M in 2018 for construction of ML-2, and in 2019 NASA awarded a $383M 44-month contract, with completion scheduled for March 2023. ML-2 is expected to run into fewer challenges than ML-1, the Inspector General report states, as NASA is "taking steps to incorporate lessons learned" from ML-1. For example, as suggested by a June 2019 Government Accountability Office report, NASA concurred that 3D modeling software shall be used "to better integrate components, manage requirement changes, and provide up-to-date designs for all stakeholders". The GAO report stated: "The improved design processes the EGS program is pursuing in the development of the second Mobile Launcher, including the development of a 3D model to facilitate integrated design, have the potential to improve program outcomes. Further, achieving design stability before beginning construction would also improve this potential."

Milestones

August 31, 2018 – The Mobile Launcher Platform (MLP) arrives at Launch Pad 39B. The ML underwent a fit check, followed by several days of systems testing.

September 8, 2018 – The MLP, atop Crawler-transporter 2, moves into the VAB for the first time.

October 17, 2018 – The first high speed retract test was completed on the Orion Service Module Umbilical (OSMU) on the MLP. The test verified umbilical arm alignment, rotation speed, and latch back systems. The OSMU will transfer power, data, and coolant for the electronics, and purge air for the environmental controls to the Orion service module and Launch Abort System.

October 30 – November 6, 2018 – Underway Recovery Test-7 (URT-7) was conducted in the Pacific Ocean. URT-7 is one in a series of tests that the Exploration Ground Systems Recovery Team, along with the U.S. Navy, are conducting to verify and validate procedures and hardware that will be used to recover the Orion spacecraft after it lands in the Pacific Ocean following deep space exploration missions.

November 19, 2018 – The Crew/Service Module Mock-up and Orion Transportation Pallet (OTP) were successfully moved to the Servicing Stand, as part of the Handling and Access (H&A) subsystem Verification and Validation testing at the Multi-Payload Processing Facility (MPPF). This testing allowed the Exploration Ground Systems (EGS) team to verify access to several servicing panels on the Orion vehicle, which will be needed to prepare Orion for Artemis 1.

December 14, 2018 – Successful countdown demonstration completed, intended to validate the launch team's capability to perform an Artemis 1 countdown and respond to challenges put into the system for practice.

April 15, 2019 – Exploration Ground Systems' launch team completed their first formal training simulation that will certify the team for the inaugural launch of the Space Launch System (SLS) and Orion spacecraft. The team, led by Launch Director Charlie Blackwell-Thompson, performed a countdown simulation of loading the SLS with liquid oxygen and hydrogen — complete with surprise issues the team had to work real-time.

July 25, 2019 – A flow test of the Ignition Overpressure Protection and Sound Suppression water deluge system was conducted on the mobile launcher at Launch Pad 39B. Modifications were made to the pad after a previous wet flow test, increasing the performance of the system.

May 6, 2020 – Launch Pad 39B at NASA's Kennedy Space Center in Florida is the site of NASA's return to the Moon and is now ready for Artemis 1—an uncrewed mission around the Moon and back. Exploration Ground Systems (EGS) has completed modifications and upgrades to the launch pad for the Space Launch System (SLS) rocket and Orion spacecraft to help accomplish NASA's lunar exploration goals.

April 27, 2021 – The last component of Artemis 1, the Space Launch System core stage, arrives at Kennedy Space Center, where EGS will spend the next ~10 months putting the whole vehicle together and running tests.

October 20, 2021 – The Artemis I Space Launch System vehicle assembly is complete. The Orion spacecraft that will fly to the Moon on NASA's Artemis 1 mission was lifted atop its Space Launch System (SLS) rocket on October 20, completing major assembly of the full vehicle stack in High Bay 3 of the Vehicle Assembly Building at Kennedy Space Center.

August 29, 2022 – The first launch attempt of Artemis 1, the Space Launch System and Orion spacecraft, is conducted at Kennedy Space Center, during a two-hour window that opened at 8:33 a.m. EDT (1233 GMT).

November 16, 2022, 1:47 a.m. – The successful launch of Artemis 1, the Space Launch System and Orion spacecraft, takes place at Kennedy Space Center. This first flight test of the world’s most powerful rocket sent an uncrewed Orion spacecraft to lunar orbit and back in preparation for sending humans to live and work on the Moon.

See also
 Artemis program
 List of Artemis missions

References

External links
 Exploration Ground Systems Website at NASA.gov
 Launch Director Charlie Blackwell-Thompson Bio at NASA.gov

NASA programs
Artemis program
Orion (spacecraft)
Space Launch System